Black Shirt is a 1933 Italian drama film directed by Giovacchino Forzano. The film was made by the Istituto Luce as a propaganda work to commemorate the tenth anniversary of Mussolini's Fascist regime. It portrays events in Italy from the beginning of the First World War to the coming to power of Mussolini and the transformation of the country since. It combines elements of normal fiction films, documentary and futurist influences.

The film The Old Guard, released the following year, is also set in the period leading up to the March on Rome.

Cast
 Enrico Marroni as Il marinaio  
 Antonietta Mecale as La moglie del fabbro  
 Enrico Da Rosa as Il fabbro  
 Guido Petri as Il suocero  
 Lamberto Patacconi as Il figlio a 4 anni 
 Pino Locchi as Il figlio a 8 anni  
 Vinicio Sofia as Il sovversivo  
 Renato Tofone as Don Venanzio, il parroco 
 Avelio Bandoni as Un combattente 
 Leo Bartoli  as Un combattente  
 Annibale Betrone as Il sindaco  
 Luisella Ciocca as Una popalana romana  
 Attila Della Spora  as Un combattente  
 Giovanni Ferrari as Un combattente  
 Loris Gizzi as Un acceso sovversivo 
 Anna Konopleff

References

Bibliography
 Brunetta, Gian Piero. The History of Italian Cinema: A Guide to Italian Film from Its Origins to the Twenty-first Century.  Princeton University Press, 2009.

External links

1933 films
1933 drama films
Italian drama films
1930s Italian-language films
Films directed by Giovacchino Forzano
Films set in the 1910s
Films set in the 1920s
Italian black-and-white films
Films about fascists
1930s Italian films